Battlefield House near King Street East and Centennial Parkway in Stoney Creek, Hamilton, Ontario, Canada is a living history museum and site of the historic Battle of Stoney Creek on June 6, 1813, which was fought during the War of 1812. It was built in 1796. The park was designated a National Historic Site in 1960.

Also located on the property are the Battlefield Monument and the Grandview (Nash-Jackson House) building. Smith's Knoll Cemetery is also nearby, across King Street East from the park. During the first weekend in June, a re-enactment of the Battle of Stoney Creek is held with re-enactors in full regalia, representing both the British and American sides. The 2016 event was the 35th such re-enactment.

The re-enactments scheduled for 2020 and 2021 were cancelled due to the covid-19 pandemic. In mid-May 2022 it was revealed that the upcoming re-enactment would also be cancelled due to "uncertainty surrounding COVID-19 restrictions" and construction taking place at Battlefield House, but would return in 2023. However, at a meeting held on May 19, it was revealed that the re-enactment would be "permanently" cancelled.  Friends of Battlefield Museum withdrew its support for the museum following the meeting.

British units made a night attack on an American encampment. Due in large part to the capture of both American brigadier generals, and an overestimation of British strength by the Americans, the battle was a victory for the British, and a turning point in the defence of Upper Canada.

The museum is affiliated with: CMA,  CHIN, and Virtual Museum of Canada.

See also
 List of attractions in Hamilton, Ontario

References

External links
Battlefield House Museum & Park (Official Site)
Hamilton Civic Museums
Official War of 1812 Bicentennial website: Battlefield House
"Musket escapes fiery end; finds a home at Stoney Creek Battlefield House Museum." (www.GeneralBrock.com)
Battle of 1812- People & Stories: Billy Green
Vintage Hamilton Postcards: Battlefield House
Ontario Ghosts & Hauntings Research Society: Battlefield House

Museums in Hamilton, Ontario
Historic house museums in Ontario
Parks in Ontario
Museums of the War of 1812